Associação Trairiense de Futebol, commonly known as Trairiense, is a Brazilian football club based in Trairi, Ceará state.

History
The club was founded on December 22, 1999. They finished in the second position in the Campeonato Cearense Third Level in 2004, when they lost the competition to Crateús.

Stadium
Associação Trairiense de Futebol play their home games at Estádio Manoel Barroso Neto, nicknamed Barrosão. The stadium has a maximum capacity of 3,000 people.

References

Association football clubs established in 1999
Football clubs in Ceará
1999 establishments in Brazil